The volleyball competition at the 2015 Games of the Small States of Europe took place from 2–6 June 2015 at the Laugardalshöll Sportshall. in Reykjavik. The beach volleyball competition took place in a specially constructed stadium outside the Sportshall.

Medal table

Medalists

References

External links
Site of the 2015 Games of the Small States of Europe

2015 Games of the Small States of Europe
Games of the Small States of Europe
2015
Volleyball in Iceland